Bahadur may refer to:

 Bahadur, a form of Baghatur, an honorific title
 Bahadur Fort, in Ahmednagar district, Maharashtra, India
 Bahadur (comics), an Indian comic book superhero
 Bahadur (film), a 1953 Indian film
 Bahadur (character), a character type in Hindi literature and media
 Bahadur, the Indian Air Force's designation for the Mikoyan MiG-27 ground-attack aircraft
 Bahadur Group, an Indian Special Forces unit

See also

 Bahadur Shah (disambiguation)
 Bahadur Singh (disambiguation)
 Nawab Bahadur (disambiguation)
 Bahadır, a Turkish forename and surname
 Rao Bahadur, a title of honour bestowed during British rule in India
 Khan Bahadur, a formal title of respect and honour conferred on non-Hindu natives of British India
 Dewan Bahadur, a title of honour awarded during British rule in India